Janusz Wiktor Wichowski (6 October 1935 in Chełm - 31 January 2013 in Valenciennes) was a Polish professional basketball player and coach. At a height of 1.96 m (6'5") tall, and a weight of 88 kg (195 lbs.), he played at the small forward position.

Professional career
Wichowski was a member of the FIBA European Selection, in 1964.

Polish national team
As a member of the senior Polish national basketball team, Wichowski competed at the 1960 Summer Olympics, and at the 1964 Summer Olympics. He also won the silver medal at the EuroBasket 1963, and the bronze medal at the EuroBasket 1965.

Awards and accomplishments
6× Polish League Top Scorer: (1956, 1957, 1958, 1959, 1960, 1964)
4× Polish League Champion: (1959, 1961, 1963, 1966)
FIBA European Selection: (1964)
Polish Cup Winner: (1968)

External links
FIBA Profile
FIBA Europe Profile
Euroleague & International Statistics

1935 births
2013 deaths
Basketball players at the 1960 Summer Olympics
Basketball players at the 1964 Summer Olympics
Olympic basketball players of Poland
People from Chełm
Sportspeople from Lublin Voivodeship
Polish basketball coaches
Polish men's basketball players
1967 FIBA World Championship players
Small forwards